Professor Evgeny Oscarovich Paton (1870–1953) was a Russian and Soviet engineer of Ukrainian descent who established the E. O. Paton Electric Welding Institute in Kyiv. Paton was a people's deputy of the Supreme Soviet of the Soviet Union (1946–1953). He was the father of Borys Paton.

Early career
Born in 1870 in Nice, France, he studied at the Dresden Technical University (graduated in 1894), and at the Petersburg Institute of Railway Roads (graduated in 1896). He designed the structure of the train station in Dresden, and was a lecturer at the  Moscow Engineering College of Railway Roads (1889–1904). Paton was a professor at Kyiv Polytechnic Institute and the Chairman of the Bridge Department from 1904 to 1938. In 1929 he organized a welding laboratory and the Electric Welding Committee. In 1934 Paton founded the Electric Welding Institute of the Academy of Sciences of Ukrainian SSR in Kyiv. From 1945 to 1952 he was a Vice-President of the Academy of Sciences of Ukrainian SSR.

Welding research
Paton was a pioneer researcher of joining and welding technology. In order to make welding a reliable technological process, it was necessary to conduct comprehensive research regarding the mechanics of welded structures, the metallurgical processes involved, and the physics of the arc, as well as to develop welding equipment, tools, and techniques.

Paton created methods used in the design of rational bridge spans, investigated the conditions of their operation, and suggested methods for restoring damaged bridges. He carried out research on the fundamentals of welding, how to calculate the strength of welded structures, and the mechanization of welding processes. He supervised the development of automatic submerged arc welding. During World War II Paton supervised the design and production of  equipment and technology for automated welding of special steels for tanks, bombs, and other military hardware.

Paton supervised the wide implementation of welding in industry, including the design and production of assembly-line welding systems. He designed welded bridges and founded a domestic school of metal welding. Paton was awarded almost all of the highest Soviet government and scientific awards and prizes, and received the title of the Hero of Socialist Labour.

References

External links
 Biography at the E.O. Paton Electric Welding Institute
 Biography at the Kyiv Polytechnic Institute (in Ukrainian)
 Biography at the Kyiv Polytechnic Institute (in English)

1870 births
1953 deaths
Burials at Baikove Cemetery
People from Nice
French people of Russian descent
History of Kyiv
Bridge engineers
Russian civil engineers
Ukrainian bridge engineers
Ukrainian civil engineers
Heroes of Socialist Labour
Soviet engineers
20th-century Russian engineers
Russian inventors
20th-century Ukrainian engineers
Ukrainian inventors
TU Dresden alumni
Russians in Ukraine
Igor Sikorsky Kyiv Polytechnic Institute
Soviet inventors